Rosebush railway station served the village of Rosebush, Pembrokeshire, Wales, from 1876 to 1949 on the Narberth Road and Maenclochog Railway.

History 
The station opened on 19 September 1876 on the Narberth Road and Maenclochog Railway. It was situated behind houses on the west side of an unnamed road. To the south were two sidings with an engine shed in the middle. Another engine shed was to the north near Rosebush Quarry. The original shed closed in 1899 and the second shed closed in 1912. It closed permanently to passengers on 25 October 1937 and closed to goods on 16 May 1949.

The station's adjacent pub, the Tafarn Sinc (Zinc Tavern), remains in business.

References

External links 

Disused railway stations in Pembrokeshire
Railway stations in Great Britain opened in 1878
Railway stations in Great Britain closed in 1883
Railway stations in Great Britain opened in 1884
Railway stations in Great Britain closed in 1885
Railway stations in Great Britain opened in 1887
Railway stations in Great Britain closed in 1887
Railway stations in Great Britain opened in 1895
Railway stations in Great Britain closed in 1917
Railway stations in Great Britain opened in 1920
Railway stations in Great Britain closed in 1937
1878 establishments in Wales
Former Great Western Railway stations